Major General Bilal Omer Khan  (Pashto, ; 3 February 1954 – 4 December 2009) was a two-star rank general in the Pakistan Army who was killed in the December 2009 Rawalpindi attack while serving as the director general of the Pakistan Armoured Corps. He posthumously received the Sitara-e-Basalat.

Early life  
He was born on 3 February 1954 to a Burki Pashtun family. Including Bilal, the Burki family has produced several military generals and cricketers such as Zahid Ali Akbar Khan, Wajid Ali Khan Burki, Imran Khan, Javed Burki, Majid Khan, and Shahid Javed Burki.

Military career
In 1973 at the age of 19, he was commissioned into the army in the 19th Lancers. 

He served as the commander of the 111th Infantry Brigade in Pakistan and as Director General Joint Staff Headquarters.

Mentorship
He was a mentor to junior army officers and air force polo players at the Rawalpindi Polo Club. Wing Commander Shafiq had said that after maghrib prayers Major General Bilal used to guide them on polo and gave them tips on how to play better and how to win crucial fixtures.

2009 Parade Lane Mosque attack and death
On 4 December 2009, he and other worshippers were praying namaz at the Parade Lane Mosque and were bowing in prayer, when suddenly explosions and gunfire rang out. Most of the people died on impact while a few others managed to escape. Bilal unharmed, put his shoes back on and got ahold of one of the terrorists, trying to disarm him, which led to the other terrorists focusing their attention on Bilal. The distraction was a key opportunity for others to escape. 

While several escaped, Bilal was shot at point blank range by another terrorist and was killed in the terrorist attack.

When his son Arsalan went to recover his body from the mosque, he said "I saw my father lay there with his hand under his head as though he was in a peaceful slumber."

Personal life
He was very passionate about the sport of Polo and was known by his friends and family as an excellent Polo player and a good hunter.

Bilal was married and had two sons and a daughter.

Legacy
The Parade Lane by the mosque bears his name.

A tennis championship is named after him at the army polo club, Major General Bilal Omer Shaheed Tennis Championship.

References 

1954 births
2009 deaths
Pakistani military personnel killed in action
Pakistan Army officers
Pakistani generals
Burki family
Imran Khan family
Pashtun people
Pakistani Muslims
Terrorism victims
Pakistani terrorism victims
Victims of the Tehrik-i-Taliban Pakistan
Recipients of Hilal-i-Imtiaz
Recipients of Sitara-i-Imtiaz
Pakistan Military Academy alumni